Armenian Catholic Eparchy of Our Lady of Nareg in the United States of America and Canada is an Armenian Catholic Church ecclesiastical territory or eparchy of the Catholic Church located in Glendale, California, United States and is immediately subject to the Holy See.  It was created by John Paul II on July 3, 1981, as the Apostolic Exarchate of United States of America and Canada for the Armenians.  It was elevated to an eparchy on September 12, 2005.  The seat of the eparchy is St. Gregory the Illuminator Cathedral in Glendale, California. The eparchy has also been known as Eparchy of Our Lady of Nareg in New York and Eparchy of Our Lady of Nareg in Glendale.

In 2012, the eparchy moved from New York City to Glendale, California. The church in New York was being sold and while the eparchy was offered a new church, the bishop decided to move the eparchy to Glendale since there were more Armenian Catholic families in the area than in New York.

Eparchs
Mikail Nersès Sétian † (July 3, 1981 – September 18, 1993) Retired
Hovhannes Tertsakian, C.A.M. † (January 5, 1995 – November 30, 2000) Retired
Manuel Batakian, I.C.P.B. † (November 30, 2000 – May 21, 2011) Retired
Mikaël Antoine Mouradian, I.C.P.B. (May 21, 2011 – present)

Parish locations
Belmont, Massachusetts
Detroit, Michigan
Glendale, California 
Little Falls, New Jersey
Los Angeles, California
New York City, New York (St. Ann’s Cathedral)
Wynnewood, Pennsylvania
Saint-Laurent, Quebec
Toronto, Ontario

References

External links
 Armenian Catholic Eparchy of Our Lady of Nareg Official Site

Armenian Catholic Eparchy of Our Lady of Nareg
Our Lady of Nareg
Armenian
Armenian Catholic eparchies
Armenian Catholic Church in the United States
Armenian Catholic Church in Canada
Our Lady of Nareg
Christian organizations established in 1981
Roman Catholic dioceses and prelatures established in the 20th century
1981 establishments in North America